Patrick Joseph Alexander "Paddy" Moran (March 11, 1877 – January 14, 1966) was a Canadian professional ice hockey goaltender. Moran played all but one of his 16 seasons for the Quebec Hockey Club, from 1901 to 1917; in the 1909–10 season, Moran played for the All-Montreal HC and the Haileybury Comets. Moran was noted for protecting the area in front of his net by aggressively using his stick, and expectorating at opposing players while chewing tobacco. He won two Stanley Cups with Quebec in 1912 and 1913. Moran was inducted into the Hockey Hall of Fame in 1958.

Early life
Moran began playing ice hockey at the age of 15, with a local Quebec team. At age 17, Moran changed schools as his school was one of the few in Quebec City not to have an ice hockey team. At the age of 19, Moran helped his new club, the Crescents, win the Intermediate Championship.

Playing career

Moran began his playing career with the Quebec Hockey Club in the Canadian Amateur Hockey League (CAHL). Over four seasons, Moran appeared in 30 games, winning 19 of them. For the 1905–06 season, the Quebec Hockey Club joined the Eastern Canada Amateur Hockey Association (ECAHA). Over the next four years, Moran appeared in 38 games, but won only 11 of them, while his lowest goals-against average in a season during that span was 6.79. In the 1909–10 season, Moran joined the All-Montreal HC from the Canadian Hockey Association (CHA) and as the league folded, he then joined the Haileybury Comets of the National Hockey Association (NHA). In his only season with the Comets, Moran posted a 3–8 record over 11 games, letting in 79 goals.

For the 1910–11 season, Moran rejoined Quebec. That year, Quebec finished last in the league, winning only four games, and letting in 97 goals against. In the 1911–12 season, Moran went 10–8 over 18 games, with a 4.26 goals-against average. They won the O'Brien Cup and the Stanley Cup after finishing with the best record in the league. In the Stanley Cup challenge against the Moncton Victorias of the Maritime Professional Hockey League (MPHL), Quebec won the first game 9–3, and the second game 8–0. Moran finished with a 1.50 goals-against average, while Jack McDonald and Joe Malone combined for 14 out of the 17 Quebec goals as Quebec won the Stanley Cup. During the 1911–12 season Moran was also manager Art Ross' goaltender of choice for the NHA All-Stars, a team which played a series of three games against the PCHA All-Stars in British Columbia, losing two games to one.

The next season, Moran went 16–4 in the regular season in 20 games, with one shutout and a 3.70 goals-against average. Quebec repeated as O'Brien Cup winners, and had a Stanley Cup challenge once more, playing against the Sydney Miners of the MPHL. Quebec repeated as champions, winning the three-game series 2–0. In the first game, Quebec won 14–3, as Malone scored nine goals, while in the second one, Quebec emerged with a slimmer margin of victory, winning 6–2.

Moran finished his career with the Bulldogs, retiring after the NHA's last season. He played four more seasons, during which he played 69 games, winning 34 of them. Over his career, Moran's teams often had losing records, or they had a winning percentage barely over 50%. Some hockey legends often recall that he was the best goaltender of them all. He was elected to the Hall of Fame in 1958, with the help of Senator Chubby Power, once a teammate. He is still the earliest goaltender in HHOF, starting his senior hockey venture in 1901.

Playing style
Moran was a stand-up style goaltender. At  and 180 lb (82 kg/12 st 12 lb), he was considered a big goaltender for his era. In Moran's era, goaltenders were not allowed to drop down to the ice to make saves, so his style suited him well. Moran was especially noted for his aggressive defense of the area in front of his net. He used his stick to slash opposing players within reach. Moran often chewed tobacco while on the ice, and another favorite tactic of his was to expectorate at opposing players. Moran's stick work was described as attempts to "slash [other players'] heads off with lightning strokes of his blade". Moran often wore oversized sweaters, claiming that they kept him warm in the cold arenas; however, he kept it unbuttoned, and often used it to catch shots.

Post-retirement
Moran retired after the 1916–17 season, at the age of 39. He was proud to have built his own house with his ice hockey earnings, which cost CAN$4,000. In 1919, Moran became a custom house builder, and continued in this career for at least 35 years. In 1944 at age 66, Moran was interviewed about his playing days, along with contemporary goaltender Percy LeSueur, who is noted for his Stanley Cup wins in 1909 and 1911 with the Ottawa Senators.  Later in his life, Moran became an avid follower of the Quebec Aces. He was inducted into the Quebec Hockey Hall of Fame. In 1958, Moran was inducted into the Hockey Hall of Fame. He died on January 14, 1966.

Statistics

Regular season

* Stanley Cup Champion.

Stanley Cup Finals

References

1877 births
1966 deaths
Anglophone Quebec people
Canadian ice hockey goaltenders
Canadian people of Irish descent
Haileybury Comets players
Hockey Hall of Fame inductees
Ice hockey people from Quebec City
Quebec Bulldogs (NHA) players
Stanley Cup champions